Hugo Dellien was the defending champion but chose not to defend his title.

Gian Marco Moroni won the title after defeating Federico Coria 6–3, 6–2 in the final.

Seeds

Draw

Finals

Top half

Bottom half

References

External links
Main draw
Qualifying draw

Aspria Tennis Cup - 1